A research spin-off is a company that falls into at least one of the four following categories:

Companies that have an Equity investment from a national library or university
Companies that license technology from a public research institute or university
Companies that consider a university or public sector employee to have been a founder
Companies that have been established directly by a public research institution

The two main research spin-off models in Russia are those developed from the Institutes of the Academy of Science and Svetlana. QinetiQ is an example of a research spin-off in the United Kingdom.

See also
 Government spin-off, civilian goods which are the result of military or governmental research
 NASA spin-off, a spin-off of technology that has been commercialized through NASA funding, research, licensing, facilities, or assistance
 University spin-off, a company founded on the findings of a member or by members of a research group at a university

References

spin-off
Types of business entity